John Marshall (c. 1958 – 23 December 2018) was an Australian jockey from Perth, who was best known for riding Rogan Josh to victory in the 1999 Melbourne Cup.

Career Stastistics
 Career Winners: 2,000
 Career Group 1 (G1) Wins: 36
 Career Group 2 (G2) Wins: 36
 Career Group 3 (G3) Wins: 30
 Career Listed (LR) Wins: 68
 Total Stakes (Group/Listed) Wins: 170

John Marshall won the Sydney Jockey Premiership in the 1987/88 season with 86 wins, beating Jim Cassidy with 65 wins.

John also finished 2nd in the Sydney Jockey's Premiership 3 times: 
 1982/83 season - 52 wins (won by Ron Quinton: 90 wins),
 1986/87 season - 85 1/2 wins (won by Malcolm Johnston: 92 1/2 wins),
 1989/90 season - 67 wins (won by Mick Dittman: 75 wins).

Group 1 Wins

1982
AJC Oaks (2400m): Sheraco
1983
Epsom Handicap (1600m): Cool River
1984
AJC Derby (2400m): Prolific
Sydney Cup (3200m): Trissaro
1985
Randwick Guineas (1600m): Spirit Of Kingston
Rosehill Guineas (2000m): Spirit Of Kingston
1986
Doomben 10,000 (1350m): Between Ourselves
Toorak Handicap (1600m): Canny Lass
1987
Champagne Stakes (1600m): Sky Chase
Spring Champion Stakes (2000m): Beau Zam
Rosehill Guineas (2000m): Ring Joe
The Galaxy (1100m) Princely Heart
Doomben 10,000 (1350m): Broad Reach
George Main Stakes (1600m) : Campaign King
1988
Rosehill Guineas (2000m): Sky Chase
George Ryder Stakes (1500m): Campaign King
Caulfied Stakes (2000m): Sky Chase
Ranvet Stakes (2000m): Beau Zam
Tancred Stakes (2400m): Beau Zam
AJC Derby (2400m): Beau Zam
Queen Elizabeth Stakes (2000m): Beau Zam
Doomben 10,000 (1350m): Campaign King
Stradbroke Handicap (1400m): Campaign King
1989
Ranvet Stakes (2000m): Beau Zam
AJC Sires Produce Stakes (1400m): Reganza
Queensland Sires Produce Stakes (1400m): Zamoff
Stradbroke Handicap (1400m): Robian Steel
1990
Rosehill Guineas (2000m): Solar Circle
George Main Stakes (1600m): Shaftesbury Avenue
1991
All Aged Stakes (1600m): Shaftesbury Avenue
1996
Coolmore Classic (1500m): Chlorophyll
1997
Ranvet Stakes (2000m): Arkady
1998
AJC Oaks (2400m): On Air
1999
Epsom Handicap (1600m): Allez Suez
Mackinnon Stakes (2000m): Rogan Josh
Melbourne Cup (3200m): Rogan Josh

Marshall died of cancer at age 60 on 23 December 2018.

References

1950s births
2018 deaths
Australian jockeys
Sportspeople from Perth, Western Australia
Deaths from cancer in Western Australia
Year of birth missing